Koserbach (in its upper course: Großer Koserbach) (also: Koser) is a river of Bavaria, Germany. It is a right tributary of the Schorgast in Wirsberg.

See also
List of rivers of Bavaria

References

Rivers of Bavaria
Rivers of Germany